John Lautafi Tafi (born 10 May 2002) is a Samoan Weightlifter who has represented Samoa at the Pacific Games and Commonwealth Games.

Tafi is from Lotopa on Upolu.

At the 2019 Pacific Games, Oceania & Commonwealth Championships in Apia he won 2 gold, 2 silver, and 9 bronze medals.

He set a new Oceania record in the 73 kg division at the 2021 Oceania Weightlifting Championships, with a snatch of 136 kg. At the 2022 Oceania Junior Championships he broke another three records, with a snatch of 133 kg, jerk of 165 kg, and total of 298 kg.

In 2022, he was one of six Samoan weightlifters to qualify for the 2022 Commonwealth Games in Birmingham, England. He competed in the men's 73 kg event.

References

Living people
2002 births
People from Tuamasaga
Samoan male weightlifters
Commonwealth Games competitors for Samoa
Weightlifters at the 2022 Commonwealth Games
21st-century Samoan people